The Alamo Hueco Mountains are a  long mountain range, located in the southeast of the New Mexico Bootheel region, southeast Hidalgo County, New Mexico, adjacent the border of Chihuahua state, Mexico. The range lies near the southern end of the mountains bordering the extensive north–south Playas Valley; the Little Hatchet and Big Hatchet Mountains are adjacent, and mostly attached north; the mountain range series, ends south into the flatland plains of the Chihuahuan Desert. The much smaller Dog Mountains are adjacent south.

While the Continental Divide of the Americas traverses the western perimeter mountains of the Playas Valley, the Continental Divide National Scenic Trail traverses the entire mountain ranges on the east side of the Playas Valley; the Scenic Trail continues south into the Chihuahuan Desert region of northwest Chihuahua state.

Description
The range is 15 mi long and only about 8 mi wide. It trends northwest by southeast and abuts the Dog Mountains to the south on the Mexico–United States border. The Alamo Hueco Mountains lie in the southeast corner of New Mexico's 'Bootheel', so the Chihuahua border also lies to the east of the mountain range.

Continental Divide National Scenic Trail
The Continental Divide lies north of the Big Hatchet Mountains and traverses the northern Playas Valley on its water divide. The Continental Divide National Scenic Trail comes through the Big Hatchet's in two trails, at the center and one in the north; also subtrails lead off southeasterly. The main traverse of the Scenic Trail exits from the southwest quarter of the range, to meet the northwest end of the Alamo Hueco Mountains.

References

External links

Range Highpoint–Big Hatchet Peak
Pierce Peak, Trails Near Pierce Peak, (coordinates)
Pierce Peak, (New Mexico Ranges, UTM table), elevation: 8356 ft

Alamo Hueco Mountains
Alamo Hueco Mountains, peakbagger.com, (elevation: 5851 ft), coordinates
Alamo Hueco Mountains Wilderness Study Area Trails

Mountain ranges of New Mexico
Mountain ranges of Hidalgo County, New Mexico
New Mexico Bootheel
Great Divide of North America